The Río Grande de Lípez is a river of Bolivia in the Potosí Department, Nor Lípez Province.

See also
 Puka Mayu
List of rivers of Bolivia

References
Rand McNally, The New International Atlas, 1993.

Rivers of Potosí Department